"Send Me" is a song by British musician Tirzah. It was produced by Mica Levi aka Micachu. The single was released on 14 April 2021. "Send Me" was described as a song being about "recovery, gratitude and new beginnings, presenting a singer having discovered the type of love that is shared between a mother and a child for the first time whilst simultaneously working as an artist."

Reception
The track has been met with positive reviews by music critics such as Pitchfork and Resident Advisor.

Music video
The music video for "Send Me" was released on 14 April 2021. It was directed by Leah Walker and features the work of movement artist ãssia.

Track listing

References

External links
 Tirzah - Send Me (Music Video on YouTube)

2021 singles
2021 songs
Tirzah_(musician)_songs